Charles Berry may refer to:
Charles Berry (minister) (1783–1877), English Unitarian and schoolteacher
Charles H. Berry (1823–1900), Minnesota Attorney General and politician
Charles Albert Berry (1852–1899), English nonconformist divine
Charlie Berry (second baseman) (1860–1940), American second baseman in Major League Baseball
Charlie Berry (1902–1972), baseball catcher and umpire, football player, and official
Charles J. Berry (1923–1945), US Marine and Medal of Honor recipient
Chuck Berry (1926–2017), American musician
Charles Berry (economist) (1930–2007), American economist
Charles Roland Berry (born 1957), American composer
Charles A. Berry (1923–2020), physician of NASA
Charles W. Berry (1871–1941), American physician, soldier, and New York City Comptroller
Chuck Berry (politician) (born 1950), member of the Colorado House of Representatives

See also
Charles Bury (disambiguation)
Charles, Duke of Berry (disambiguation)
Chuck Berry (disambiguation)